Marco Antonio Angulo Solórzano (born 8 May 2002) is an Ecuadorian professional footballer who plays as a defensive midfielder for Major League Soccer club FC Cincinnati and the Ecuador national team.

Club career
Angulo began his career with Rocafuerte, before joining Independiente del Valle in 2017. He made 24 appearances and scored three goals for Independiente Juniors in 2020 and 2021, before joining the club's senior team in October 2021. Across all competitions, Angulo went on to make 45 appearances and score three goals in 2021 and 2022 for Independiente del Valle, winning the U-20 Copa Libertadores in 2020, the Serie A de Ecuador in 2021, and the Copa Ecuador and the Copa Sudamericana in 2022.

On 21 December 2022, it was announced that on 1 January 2023, Angulo would join Major League Soccer side FC Cincinnati until 2025 in a reported $3 million deal. He made his debut for Cincinnati in stoppage time of a 4 March 2023 match against Orlando City SC.

International career
In November 2022, Angulo was called up to the Ecuadorian senior squad. He made his debut on 12 November 2022, appearing as a substitute during a 0–0 draw with Iraq.

Personal
On 28 November 2022, Angulo was involved in a traffic accident that lead to the death of the driver of the vehicle he was a passenger in.

References

External links

2002 births
Living people
Association football midfielders
FC Cincinnati players
Ecuadorian footballers
Ecuadorian expatriate footballers
Ecuador international footballers
Expatriate soccer players in the United States
Ecuadorian expatriate sportspeople in the United States
Ecuadorian Serie A players
C.S.D. Independiente del Valle footballers
Major League Soccer players